Weiwuying can refer to the following:
 National Kaohsiung Center for the Arts, also known as Weiwuying
 Weiwuying metro station